Qihua Road is a metro station in Baoshan District, Shanghai. It is part of Line 7.

Due to station complexities, the station is the last to open on the line; it began operation on 22 July 2014, more than 4 years after the line initially opened.

Nearby
Shanghai University, Baoshan Campus

Railway stations in Shanghai
Shanghai Metro stations in Baoshan District
Line 7, Shanghai Metro
Railway stations in China opened in 2014